Shaka Bundu is the debut album by South African musician Penny Penny released in 1994. Penny was discovered in a Johannesburg recording studio by producer Joe Shirimani, who was impressed by Penny's unique vocal style. Shirimani's record label Shandel Music enjoyed the demos he produced for Penny, and let the pair record an album together. Recorded over the space of one week using an Atari computer, Korg M1 synthesiser and reel-to-reel tape, the album blends the Tsonga disco style of music with American house music, reflecting the popularity of American and British electronic dance music in South Africa. It has been credited for pioneering a new style of Tsonga disco with its fusion of slow house rhythms, synthesised steel drums and Penny's modern vocal style atop traditional call-and-response female backing vocals.

Released on cassette by Shandel Music, Shaka Bundu was a success in South Africa, selling over 250,000 copies in the country and being certified double platinum. Its success was surprising, given that its lyrics are in the obscure Xish Angana variation of the Tsonga language. The album established Penny Penny as a pop star and also helped improve opinion on Xitsonga music among Tsonga people, as well as establishing Shirimani as a noted producer. Though Penny fell into obscurity in the 2000s, American record label Awesome Tapes From Africa re-released the album worldwide in 2013, which gave Penny a renewed popularity. He began playing live again and recording new music as a result of the success of the re-release.

Background and recording

Penny Penny (real name Giyani Kulani) was born in Limpopo in 1962 and was the youngest of 68 children from a local doctor with 25 wives. His family was poor, meaning he never had schooling, but he soon became known for his dancing and was nicknamed Penny. In the 1980s, he began creating music he described as a fusion of African music, breakdance and the musical style of Michael Jackson. Aged 19, he worked on a West Driefontein goldmine near Carletonville, where he won breakdancing trophies, but he soon returned home to escape the region's poor working conditions.  He supported his music by working in mines and opening a restaurant. Penny was determined to make a connection with the South African music industry, and in the 1990s this meant he began working as a janitor in a Johannesburg recording studio belonging to South African musician Selwyn Shandel. He had nowhere to sleep so he would hide in the studio overnight and clean it, so that the owners could open it in the morning to find it cleaned. During his shifts, he would discreetly teach himself how to operate the recording equipment.

During one of Penny's shift in 1994, he approached Afrobeat/Tsonga disco producer Joseph Shirimani, who was working in the studio with another artist, and asked to work with him. Shirimani asked if Penny could sing, at which point, as Shirimani recalls, "[h]e didn't say yes. He just sang a song for me. And that's when I heard this unusual voice and those melodies." Impressed by his tuneful yet raspy singing, Shirimani agreed to produce material for Penny. The producer's colleagues were initially unsure of the singer, who they saw as more of a comedian than a performer, but Shirimani nonetheless produced three demos for Penny, one of which, "Shaka Bundu", was inspired by a friend who badmouthed the singer to the latter's wife and then proposed to her.

The three demos that the pair had created greatly impressed Shirimain's colleagues and Shandel Music, the label to which Shirimani was affiliated, and the label let Shirimani produce a whole album for Penny, also titled Shaka Bundu, which they recorded in only a week. Shirimani produced the album and played keyboards, whilst Penny sung the lyrics. The album's female backing vocalists were later named the Shaka Bundu girls, who subsequently released their own album of music as a group. Further backing vocals from the singer Momi appear on "Shichangani" and "Dance Khomela". The album's re-release credits Fraser Lesotho for engineering and David Solole for mixing.

Composition

The music on Shaka Bundu fuses the Tsonga disco (or Shangaan disco) style – which originated from the Tsonga culture in northern South Africa – with contemporary house music from the United States. The house influence reflects the popularity of English and American dance-club hits in South Africa, which proved to the country's musicians that a contemporary sound need not be achieved by sophisticated instruments, but instead with "plucky small studios and canny producers," thus bringing about a technological revolution in the music the country produced. Penny Penny cited Londonbeat's 1991 hit "I've Been Thinking About You" as an influence, while one writer also wrote of the possible influence from Soul II Soul, not just in the music but in Penny's hairstyle, which is reminiscent to that of Jazzie B. The album possesses a rough, yet sufficiently hooky feel, with Penny's "gruff" voice offering an unlikely accompaniment to the music.

The music is provided by Shirimani, who was inspired by Chicago house in particular and blends the genre's deep bass and harsh piano, as was typified by the music of Larry Heard and Marshall Jefferson, with South African melodies. The call and response vocals on the album are also a distinctly South African characteristic. The majority of the songs run at 100 beats per minute, ( bpm ) and were recorded using a reel-to-reel tape, an Atari computer and a Korg M1 synthesiser. Distinctive of Shirimanis production is a static bass line which displays the root tones of an organ, albeit with a "peculiar richness and depth."  Fact Magazine described the album's musical style as "good-time house," comparing it to Inner City, albeit with "some added springbok flavour," while future collaborator Brian Shimkovitz described Shaka Bundu as a synth-pop album.

Penny presents a party vibe throughout the album that was described by NPR as  "hearty but not frantic, more plain sexy than raunchy." The songs are in the Tsonga or Xitsonga language, or more specifically its Limpopo-region dialect Xihlanganu, one of the least-heard languages in South Africa. Penny explained: "When I made the demo everyone was like 'Na na na na na, don't like this.' But I wanted to introduce my language to the world." By using the Xitsonga language and its "music-like linguistic flavors," Penny and Shirimani highlight their ethnic Tsonga identity. The lyrics are joyous and spiritually call for positive vibes. Shimkovitz credits the album's rising and falling, slow tempo house rhythms and synthesised steel drum sounds, as well as Penny applying his rap-like vocal delivery atop the otherwise iconic Tsonga musical style of female call-and-response vocals, as creating a new style of Tsonga disco.

Songs
Opening song "Shichangani" has been described as a highlight example of Tsonga disco by one writer, who felt it departed from the low-budget, repetitious sounding nature of most songs in the genre and thus introduces the album's inventive variations upon Tsonga disco. The title track was referred to by Shirimani as among the first songs to mix traditional South African melodies with dance-pop. Rolling Stone called it "an example of Tsonga (or Shangaan) Afro-disco" and wrote that it "updated traditional African music with synthesizers, electric guitars, and disco or house beats." The Guardian described the song as Afrobeat. It was written about a friend of Penny's who proposed to Penny's girlfriend of eight years after she dumped him when he lost his job, and gives the album its name, a local term for "bad guy". "Ndzhihere Bhi" contains new wave-styled guitar figures reminiscent of the Cure. The only song to run at a faster tempo is "Dance Khomela", which contains elements of Italo house and has been compared to Jinny's hit "Keep Warm".

Release
Shaka Bundu was released in 1994 by Shandel Music as a cassette in South Africa.
The title track, "Shaka Bundu", was released as a single and became both a local sensation and a huge hit throughout South Africa. Shaka Bundu was also huge commercial success in the country, where it topped the South African Albums Chart, and sold 250,000 copies. It was ultimately certified double platinum, and remains the best-selling album of Tsonga music ever. Several songs from the album had music videos, including one for the title track. The nationwide success of Shaka Bundu was surprising, as it was entirely in the little-spoken Tsonga language, which had a difficult time breaking out. Shrimani was very surprised first and foremost by the success of the single: "Jesus, it was unbelievable. Some people don't know how to speak that language — it's a small nation. But it became a hit. The combination of traditional melodies with dance pop, that was something new." Penny explained his usage of the language on the album in retrospect:

Until the release of Shaka Bundu, Tsonga music was dominated by Paul Ndlovu, who had a hit with "Ts'akane," and the late Peta Teanet, and Tsonga disco was still only accepted within the Northern Province. Shrimani recalled: "Shangaan people suffered from an inferiority complex and didn't want to be seen playing Shangaan music in their homes." The release of Shaka Bundu helped change this attitude, and introduced Shrimani as a new talent. He became recognised for his Tsonga music productions and was swamped with requests from others to work with him. As a pop star, Penny was visually distinguished by his hairstyle, which contained elaborate topknots. He toured relentlessly throughout South Africa to make a living, as piracy permeated the country's record industry, with every one of three CDs in South Africa being said to be a pirated copy. He recorded several further albums, including Laphinda Shangaan (1997) and Makanjta Jive (1998), which both outsold Shaka Bundu in the region. Despite his national success, he was never distributed outside of South Africa, and soon drifted into obscurity as the country's music trends moved on.

Western rediscovery and re-release
In April 2010, American DJ and Musicologist Brian Shimkovitz posted the music from Shaka Bundu onto his blog Awesome Tapes from Africa (which specialised in posting music from rare African cassettes) with the description: "The tape contains simple yet deep synth-pop anthems that couldn’t give a fuck if you thought they sounded corny at first. It’s that kind of tape." Shimkovitz had only recently heard the cassette and became obsessed, enjoying it for standing out within Tsonga disco due to Penny's distinctive raspy vocals and joyous songs and Shirimanis unique, American club music-influenced production. He also played material from the album on his Awesome Tapes from Africa DJ sets around the United States, Europe, Canada and Australia, where audiences greeted it with what he described as overwhelming positive reaction.

When the blog started a record label, also named Awesome Tapes From Africa, Shimkovitz hoped to re-release the album on the label and tried to contact Penny Penny, but could not locate him, despite even travelling to South Africa on his search and asking people where he could be found. He eventually found Penny three years later, discovering he was by then working in the African National Congress as a council member. When the two spoke on the phone, Penny agreed to let Shimkovitz re-release the album. The singer was surprised to contacted by Shimkovitz. He said: "I never think this album can take me to America. Even now, I can't believe people there like it. To me it's like a dream." Shimkowitz and Penny agreed to cut their profits 50/50 from the re-release, and the singer flew to the United States for the re-release's launch.

In September 2013, the label released several songs, including "Shichangani", as free downloads. These tracks proved popular with online audiences, especially Spanish listeners. The label re-released Shaka Bundu on vinyl, CD, cassette and as a download on 12 November 2013. The re-release was worldwide, and Shimkovitz hoped its wider exposure would help generate enough interest for Penny Penny to secure him some live performances abroad. Milo Miles of NPR felt the  re-release exemplified the larger trend of Western labels bringing vintage African pop to new audiences. The album's re-release caused Penny to once again become a "global cult music sensation" and allow him to make profits from his music outside South Africa, where piracy had continued to permeate record sales. He explained: "I believe everything is in the hands of the gods – 'In the day, in the time, something good is going to happen for you, Penny Penny'." Penny was pleased to see the album was popular with audiences in Africa and Australia. He had been shocked to hear his music had been popular in Australia for many years and organisers there had been trying to contact him for six years.

Reception and aftermath

Among reviews of the re-release, Stewart Smith of The List rated the album four out of five and noted that, as a Tsonga/Shangaan disco album, it may appeal to those who enjoy the Shangaan electro style of Tshetsha Boys and Nozinja, a genre he felt was a more frenetically paced successor to Tsonga disco. He nonetheless wrote: "Shaka Bundu is not just of historical interest, however. Music this joyful, melodic and danceable will always be relevant." Fact Magazine wrote that the album boasts "a pleasantly rough feel, but Penny and his producer Joe Shirimani keep things sufficiently hooky and beefy to impress. Really corking stuff, in short." They further made note of Shaka Bundu as being "one of the most country’s most feted house albums," while Sowetan LIVE called it a "seminal album." Anton Spice of The Vinyl Factory called the album "Penny Penny’s definitive Shangaan Disco record."

The re-release allowed Penny Penny to revive his musical career, and he began playing a string of international live shows, including at Tin Pan Alley, New York City, in May 2014, where he performed with a ten-piece band, and at the Sydney Opera House a month later. He released a new album, Siyayi Vuma, in 2016. He also starred in his own Mzansi Magic reality show, Papa Penny Ahee!, in 2017. The surge in Penny's popularity led Rolling Stone to compare him to Sixto Rodriguez, an American folk singer who had South African success but was thought to have died until the documentary Searching for Sugar Man corrected the myth and bought Rodriguez attention in America.

Track listing

Side one
 "Shichangani" – 5:36
 "Shibandza" – 5:29
 "Ndzihere Bhi" – 5:47
 "Dance Khomela" – 5:32

Side two

 "Shaka Bundu" – 4:50# 
 "Zirimini" – 5:05
 "Milandu Bhe" – 4:27
 "Shichangani" (Remix) – 5:12

Personnel
Penny Penny – vocals
Joe Shirimani – producer, keyboards
Fraser Lesotho – engineering
David Solole – mixing
Shaka Bundu girls – backing vocals
Momi – backing vocals on "Shichangani" and "Dance Khomela"

References

1994 albums
Penny Penny albums